Bradyrhizobium diazoefficiens is a species of bacteria from the genus of Bradyrhizobium.

References

External links
Type strain of Bradyrhizobium diazoefficiens at BacDive -  the Bacterial Diversity Metadatabase

Nitrobacteraceae
Bacteria described in 2013